Anwar Tawfik (born 31 July 1914, date of death unknown) was an Egyptian fencer. He competed in the individual and team foil and team épée events at the 1936 Summer Olympics.

References

External links
 

1914 births
Year of death missing
Egyptian male épée fencers
Olympic fencers of Egypt
Fencers at the 1936 Summer Olympics
Egyptian male foil fencers